The 2014 FIBC CBC Championship in the British Virgin Islands serves as the qualifier for the 2014 Centrobasket for Caribbean national teams. The top three advance to the Centrobasket.

Preliminary round

Group A

Group B

Classification round

Final round

Final ranking
These were the final rankings. The top 3 teams qualify for the 2014 Centrobasket.

References

FIBA CBC Championship
2014–15 in North American basketball
2014 in British Virgin Islands sport
2014 in Caribbean sport
July 2014 sports events in North America
International basketball competitions hosted by the British Virgin Islands
Road Town